This article lists events from the year 2017 in Cameroon.

Incumbents
President: Paul Biya
Prime Minister: Philémon Yang

Events

Sport
5 February – Cameroon defeated Egypt in the 2017 Africa Cup of Nations Final.

Deaths
8 January – Zacharie Noah, footballer (b. 1937).

References

Links

 
2010s in Cameroon
Years of the 21st century in Cameroon
Cameroon
Cameroon